Thomas Shannon (November 15, 1786 – March 16, 1843) served briefly as a U.S. Representative from Ohio from December 1826 to January 1827.

Biography 
Born in Washington County, Pennsylvania, he attended public schools and moved to Ohio with his parents, who settled in Belmont County, Ohio in 1800. He engaged in agricultural pursuits and later moved to Barnesville in Belmont County in 1812 where he entered the mercantile business. During the War of 1812 served as captain of Belmont County Company in Colonel John Delong’s regiment.

Congress 
He served as a member of the Ohio House of Representatives from 1819 to 1822 and again in 1824 and 1825. In 1826, he was elected as an Adams candidate to the 19th Congress to fill the vacancy caused by the resignation of David Jennings and served from December 4, 1826, to March 3, 1827.

He did not seek renomination in 1827 and returned to Barnesville, Ohio, where he became a leaf-tobacco merchant. He was elected to and served in the Ohio State Senate in 1829 and again from 1837 to 1843. He died in Barnesville and is interred in Green Mount Cemetery.

Thomas Shannon was the brother of Wilson Shannon, Governor of Ohio and Territorial Governor of Kansas Territory.

See also
 Shannon Political Family

External links

1786 births
1846 deaths
Ohio state senators
Members of the Ohio House of Representatives
People from Washington County, Pennsylvania
People from Barnesville, Ohio
American military personnel of the War of 1812
National Republican Party members of the United States House of Representatives from Ohio
19th-century American politicians